Lebanon competed at the 2004 Summer Olympics in Athens, Greece, from 13 to 29 August 2004.

Athletics

Lebanese athletes have so far achieved qualifying standards in the following athletics events (up to a maximum of 3 athletes in each event at the 'A' Standard, and 1 at the 'B' Standard).

Men
Field events

Women
Track & road events

Key
Note–Ranks given for track events are within the athlete's heat only
Q = Qualified for the next round
q = Qualified for the next round as a fastest loser or, in field events, by position without achieving the qualifying target
NR = National record
N/A = Round not applicable for the event
Bye = Athlete not required to compete in round

Shooting 

Lebanon has qualified one shooter through a tripartite invitation.

Men

Swimming

Men

Women

See also
 Lebanon at the 2002 Asian Games

References

External links
Official Report of the XXVIII Olympiad
Lebanon Olympic Committee

Nations at the 2004 Summer Olympics
2004 Summer Olympics
Summer Olympics